A songwriter is an individual who writes both the lyrics and music to a song.

Songwriter may also refer to:
Songwriter (Justin Hayward album)
Songwriter (Apo Hiking Society album)
Songwriter (Bill Anderson album)
Songwriter (Richard Marx album)
The Songwriter, an album by Arthur Doyle
Songwriter (film), a 1984 film directed by Alan Rudolph